Kati Kraaving (born 1 July 1980) is an Estonian badminton player.

She was born in Tallinn. In 2002 she graduated from Tallinn University of Technology with a degree in business management.

She began her badminton career in 1990, coached by Koit Muru. She is two-times (1996 and 1998) Estonian champion in badminton. 1996–2001 she was a member of Estonian national badminton team.

She is also played squash, and also won Estonian championships.

References

Living people
1980 births
Estonian female badminton players
Tallinn University of Technology alumni
Sportspeople from Tallinn